Philip Lawrence Borg-Olivier (born on 4 June 1980) is a British actor, model and stage performer best known for playing the role of Tim "Tinhead" O'Leary in the soap opera Brookside.

Career 

Olivier's first role was in 1995 in the Channel 4 production Hearts and Minds with Christopher Eccleston. In 1996, he started playing his first television role as Timothy "Tinhead" O'Leary in the Channel 4 soap opera Brookside, and continued in the role until the show was cancelled in 2003. He also appeared in the one-off drama Brookside: Unfinished Business, which followed the series in 2003.

After leaving Brookside, Olivier performed in two dozen audio plays based on the Doctor Who television series by Big Finish Productions as a companion of the Seventh Doctor named Hex. He has also appeared as one of the guest regulars in the Channel 4 comedy sketch show Bo Selecta. Popular with gay audiences, Olivier hosted Mr Gay UK in 2005 and appeared on-stage at several Gay Pride events. Olivier appeared nude in the December 2008 and April 2009 editions of the gay magazine Attitude.

In 2005, he won the Channel 4 reality TV show The Games, dominating the competition from start to finish. After displaying an impressive physique in the series, Olivier went on to do a number of photo shoots and released calendars from 2006 to 2009.Also in 2006 he appeared as Jimmy Price, a self-centred professional footballer who sustains a broken leg in The Royal episode 'From This Day Forward.'

Olivier appeared in a celebrity edition of Come Dine with Me in February 2009. He competed alongside Christopher Biggins, Julia Bradbury and Edwina Currie and finished second to Biggins, the eventual winner. During February and March 2009, he competed in "Escape from Takeaway Prison", a section on Ant & Dec's Saturday Night Takeaway, which he won on 21 March 2009. Olivier also appeared in an episode of Missing, a BBC One afternoon drama, playing club owner and gangster Mark Stone in March of the same year. 2009 also saw Olivier start to perform in musicals. He starred in Never Forget which is about a Take That tribute band forming. He played the role of former stripper Dirty Harry. He also starred in the title role of the Camberley Theatre pantomime Dick Whittington.

In 2014, Olivier first appeared in the sixth series of Benidorm as the troublesome Jason Gallagher. He reprised the role in 2015.

In 2019, he appeared in the LGBT short film Just Me co-starring actor Carl Loughlin. The film addressed the theme of accepting your sexuality, and heterosexual men who have sex with men. The film gathered a lot of attention in the LGBT worldwide press, including an interview in The Advocate magazine. Just Me was released in October 2019 by Peccadillo Pictures as part of their "Boys on Film" collection.

Personal life

In 2013, Olivier featured in an episode of the Channel 4 production of Four in a Bed where he and his friend Alfie Bubble own and run the Liverpool B&B 'Yellow Submarine'.

Olivier and his partner Amy have five children. He is the grandson of former Maltese prime minister George Borg Olivier.

Filmography

Television

Film

References

External links 

 

1980 births
English male television actors
Male actors from Liverpool
English male models
Reality show winners
Living people
English people of French descent